Athletics Australia is the national sporting organisation (NSO) recognised by Sport Australia for the sport of athletics in Australia.

First founded in 1897, the organisation is responsible for administering a sport with over 16,000 registered athletes, coaches and officials.

History
Athletics Australia (AA) was originally the Athletic Union of Australasia, an amateur group founded in 1897. In 1928, New Zealand broke away to form its own national body, leaving what was known as the Amateur Athletics Union of Australia (AAU). In 1932, an Australian Women's Amateur Athletics Union (AWAAU) was instituted and remained responsible for women's athletics until 1978. In that year, the separate national unions amalgamated into one governing body which, in 1989, was rebranded as Athletics Australia.

Overview
Athletics Australia conducts the Australian Athletics Tour and the Australian Athletics Championships, where athletes compete to gain selection for the Olympic Games, Commonwealth Games and World Championships.

The association also provides co-ordination, guidance, and support to member associations and affiliates, which govern athletics in their respective states, territories or jurisdictions (e.g. Paralympic athletics).

A number of committees and commissions specialise in areas such as race walking, coaching and anti-doping.

Hall of Fame
Athletics Australia established its Hall of Fame in 2000 to recognise outstanding achievement among Australia's greatest athletes. Induction is at the discretion of Athletics Australia's Special Awards Committee.

See also

 Australian Athletics Championships
 Australian Athletics Team
 List of Australian athletics champions (men)
 List of Australian athletics champions (women)
 Australian records in athletics

References

External links
 

Australia
Athletics in Australia
Sports governing bodies in Australia
1897 establishments in Australia
Sports organizations established in 1897
National governing bodies for athletics